Marishes is a civil parish in the Ryedale district of North Yorkshire, England. Whilst the main occupation of the residents in the parish is agricultural in nature, the area is known for its onshore gas field. In 2015, the population of the parish was estimated to be 140.

History 
Marishes parish occupies a swathe of low-lying land, bordered on three sides by watercourses; the River Derwent to the east, the Costa Beck to the west and the River Rye to the south. The name derives from the Old Norse Mersc, meaning The Marshes. The land was mostly marsh until it was drained. The area was mentioned in the Domesday Book as Loft Marishes, but no recorded population. At the Dissolution, Loft Marishes/Loftmarish belonged to Rievaulx Abbey (along with Deerholme, a named place in the modern parish). It was last mentioned in 1649.

A Wesleyan chapel was erected in 1848, and an Anglican church in 1863. The church, which is in the hamlet of Low Marishes, is still a place of worship (as a chapel-of-ease) in the Benefice of Pickering with Lockton and Levisham. The structure is a grade II listed building and is noted for its unusual spire, being prominent in the flat landscape. In 2004, an application was made to allow for automatic licensing for weddings, and it was found that the church had been running for 140 years without a licence for public worship. It was at this time, that the dedication to St Francis was approved.

In 1893, the parish was described as a "township and chapelry in the Whitby Division of the [North] Riding." The school, which had been built in 1830, had an enrolment of 23 pupils, but could accommodate 45. An ecclesiastical parish profile in 2020, found that most of the current residents are employed in agriculture, and are scattered across the parish, with almost 20 houses in High Marishes, and 16 dwellings in Low Marishes.

The parish is bisected by the A169 Road, which connects Malton in the south, with Pickering in the north. The parish used to have a railway station on the Malton to Pickering line, but this closed in March 1965. Public transport is now provided on the A169 with the Coastliner buses (number 840) between Leeds, York and Pickering.

Gas field 
Marishes parish sits atop a gas field, which produces hydrocarbons for a gas-fired power station at East Knapton. Drilling in the area was first undertaken in 1937, and gas fields under the parish were first discovered in 1988. Production from Marishes started in 1998. The gas is from a field known as the Kirkham Abbey Formation, which is known to be heavy with hydrogen sulphide (sour gas).

Governance 
The parish forms part of the Thirsk and Malton Constituency for national government purposes.

In the 2001 census, the population of the parish was 123, which had risen to 132 at the 2011 census. In 2015, North Yorkshire County Council estimated the population of the parish to be 140.

Notes

References

Sources

External links 

Parish boundary for polling purposes

Civil parishes in North Yorkshire
Ryedale